Elizabeth West was a northern suburb of Adelaide, South Australia in the City of Playford. It was established in 1955 as a satellite suburb to the Elizabeth town centre. The northern part of Elizabeth West was combined with Elizabeth Field to create the new suburb of Davoren Park in 1993. The remainder of Elizabeth West was combined with some land on its west removed from Penfield to create the new suburb of Edinburgh North on 27 October 2011.

The part north of Womma Road was predominantly residential, the area south of Womma Road which is now in Edinburgh North was predominantly industrial. It was served by the Womma and Broadmeadows stations on the Gawler railway line.

References

Former suburbs of Adelaide